Old World Underground, Where Are You Now? is the first studio album by Canadian indie rock band Metric. The album was released on September 2, 2003, on Enjoy Records (now known as Everloving Records) and Last Gang Records in Canada and went gold in Canada. It was produced by Michael Andrews, recorded at Elgonix Labs, Los Angeles, and mixed at Sonora Recordings.

The songs "Combat Baby" and "Dead Disco" were released as singles. Music videos were produced for the following songs: "Calculation Theme", "IOU", "Combat Baby", "Succexy", "The List", "Dead Disco".

Track listing

Personnel

Metric
Emily Haines – vocals, synthesizers
James Shaw – guitar, vocals
Joshua Winstead – bass guitar
Joules Scott-Key – drums

Production
Michael Andrews – producer
Edson Miller – engineer, mixing
Joe Gastwirt – mastering
Josh Hassin – album cover design

References

2003 debut albums
Metric (band) albums
Everloving Records albums
Last Gang Records albums